Toni Rose is an American retired professional wrestler.

Professional wrestling career 
Rose grew up in Indianapolis, Indiana. She decided to become a professional wrestler at the age of seven, but first attended Terre Haute High School and college. She trained under The Fabulous Moolah in 1965. During her first match, which occurred in Atlanta, Georgia, her opponent Bambi Bell knocked Rose unconscious.

During a match in Australia in 1969, Rose was injured and left partially blind in one eye. In the early 1970s, Rose held the National Wrestling Alliance's NWA Women's World Tag Team Championship twice with The Fabulous Moolah. They first won the title in May 1970, but lost it to Donna Christanello and Kathy O'Day. During a rematch in June, Rose and Moolah regained the title. Later that November, Rose won the title, this time with Christanello. In 1972 at the Superbowl of Wrestling, they defended the World Women's Tag Team Championship against Sandy Parker and Debbie Johnson. During their reign, there was an unrecorded title change; Susan "Tex" Green and Parker won the title from Christanello and Rose in November 1971 in Hawaii, but they regained it in February 1972 in Hong Kong. After a three-year reign as champions, they were officially defeated for the title by the team of Joyce Grable and Vicki Williams on October 15, 1973, in New York City. It was not until October 1975 that Rose and Christanello regained the title from Grable and Williams, holding it for approximately four years.

During this time, she also wrestled against Susan "Tex" Green in Leroy McGuirk's promotion. During her career, Rose was also a contender for Moolah's NWA World Women's Championship, but never won the title. In December 1974, Rose was in a match to crown the vacated NWA United States Women's Championship, but lost to Ann Casey.

Championships and accomplishments 
 National Wrestling Alliance
 NWA Southern Women's Championship (Georgia version) (1 time)
 NWA Women's World Tag Team Championship (5 times) – with The Fabulous Moolah (2) and Donna Christanello (3)
 Professional Wrestling Hall of Fame
 Class of 2018
Women’s Wrestling Hall of Fame
Class of 2023
On May 15, Rose was inducted into the 2021 class of the Carolina Wrestling Hall of Fame. During her induction, she was also presented with the Lifetime Achievement Award.

Footnotes

References

Further reading

External links 
 Online World of Wrestling profile

American female professional wrestlers
Living people
Professional Wrestling Hall of Fame and Museum
Stampede Wrestling alumni
21st-century American women
1945 births
20th-century professional wrestlers